Wesley, also titled Wesley: A Heart Transformed Can Change The World, is a 2009 biopic about John Wesley and Charles Wesley, the founders of the Methodist movement. The movie is based largely on the Wesley brothers' own journals, including John's private journal which was kept in a shorthand-like code that was not translated until the 1980s by Richard Heitzenrater at Duke Divinity School.

The film covers the critical period of John Wesley's life as he struggles with his own doubts and insecurities, leading up to his life-changing Aldersgate experience and the early development of the Methodist movement.

Wesley was filmed in a number of authentic 18th century locations in and around Winston-Salem, North Carolina, including St. Paul's Episcopal Church.

Unusual for a lower-budget independent film, it features an original orchestral score recorded by a full orchestra. The score, composed by Bruce Kiesling, uses snippets of Wesley hymns and portions composed to echo authentic 18th-century style. Kiesling, who has composed scores for a number of other films, is currently conductor of the Tulare County Orchestra in California.

Funded in part by the Christian History Institute and Comenius Foundation, the movie was directed by John Jackman.

Cast
Burgess Jenkins - John Wesley
R. Keith Harris - Charles Wesley
June Lockhart - Susanna Wesley
Kevin McCarthy - Bishop Rider
Michael Huie - Samuel Wesley
Rusty Martin - Young John Wesley
Carrie Anne Hunt - Sophy Hopkey
Leanne Bernard - Grace Murray
Lloyd Arneach - Tomochichi
Hilary Russo -	Mary Musgrove
Bill Oberst Jr. - Peter Boehler
Erik Nelson - Mr. Delamotte
Roger Willie -	Cusseta
James France - Wealthy Mine Owner
Kai Elijah Hamilton - Mob Man (Cameo)

Reception
Jeff Paton from The Arminian magazine called it "Impressive for a religious film;" but criticized the poor effects and overplayed ideas of "a Wesleyan Quadrilateral, which was not a large part of Wesley's emphasis or ministry".

Festivals and awards
Wesley has been featured in numerous international film festivals, including:

 2010 Bayou City Inspirational Film Festival
 2010 Phoenix International Christian Film Festival
 2010 CEVMA Film Festival, Milan, Italy
 2010 International Christian Film Festival, Port Talbot, Wales
 2010 Heart of England Film Festival, Worcester, UK
 2010 Gideon Film Festival
 
The film won several awards, including:

 2010 Platinum FEXY Award (motion graphics/CGI special FX) – TechniCine, Foundery Pictures, Wesley
 2010 Platinum EMPixx Award, CGI/Special Effects – TechniCine, Foundery Pictures
 2010 Silver Telly Award (Religion & Spirituality)
 2010 Bronze Telly Award (History & Biography)
 2010 Bronze Telly Award (Lighting)
 2010 Bronze Telly Award (CGI/Special Effects)
 2010 Silver Crown, "Best Drama over $250,000," 2010 International Christian Visual Media Association Crown Awards
 2010 Bronze Crown for "Best Picture," 2010 International Christian Visual Media Association Crown Awards
 2010 First Place Feature Film Competition, Bayou City Inspirational Film Festival

References

External links
 
 
 Circuit Rider Magazine Review
 Reading Eagle Review
 DOVE Foundation Review
 United Methodist Reporter Review

2009 films
Films about Christianity
Films directed by John Jackman
Biographical films about religious leaders
2000s English-language films